"Lover Man", or "Lover Man (Oh, Where Can You Be?)", is a 1941 song made popular by Billie Holiday.

Lover Man may also refer to:
Lover Man (Duke Jordan album), 1979 
Lover Man (Archie Shepp album), 1989
Lover Man: A Tribute to Billie Holiday, John Hicks 1993
"Lover Man", song by Jimi Hendrix from Isle of Wight
"Loverman", a 1994 song by Nick Cave
"Loverman", song by Train from A Girl, a Bottle, a Boat

See also 
"Mr. Loverman", a song by Shabba Ranks